Asbjørnsen is a Norwegian surname. Notable people with the surname include:

Kristin Asbjørnsen (born 1971),  Norwegian jazz singer
Øyvind Asbjørnsen (born 1963), Norwegian film producer
Peter Christen Asbjørnsen (1812–1855),  Norwegian writer
Sigvald Asbjørnsen (1867–1954), Norwegian-born American sculptor

See also
Battleships Asbjørnsen and Moe, fictional ships
Aspinwall (surname)

Norwegian-language surnames